Leucopogon esquamatus, commonly known as the swamp beard-heath, is a species of flowering plant in the heath family Ericaceae and is endemic to south-eastern Australia. It is a slender shrub with mainly elliptic leaves, and short-lived white, tube-shaped flowers arranged singly or in pairs in upper leaf axils.

Description
The lower surface of the leaves is paler than the upper surface and is faintly striated, the edges with minute teeth near the tip.

Taxonomy
Leucopogon esquamatus was first formally described in 1810 by Robert Brown in his Prodromus Florae Novae Hollandiae. The specific epithet (esquamatus) means "without scales", possibly to distinguish it from other similar plants with scale-like leaves.

Distribution and habitat
Swamp beard-heath usually grows in swampy heath, sometimes in forest or at the base of sandstone cliffs and is found in New South Wales south from Brooms Head near Angourie to poorly-drained near-coastal heath as far west as Marlo in north-eastern Victoria. It also grows on sandy headlands on Flinders and Cape Barren Islands in Tasmania.

References

esquamatus
Ericales of Australia
Flora of New South Wales
Flora of Victoria (Australia)
Flora of Tasmania
Plants described in 1810
Taxa named by Robert Brown (botanist, born 1773)